Olaf Haraldsson (Old Norse: Óláfr Haraldsson) may refer to:

 Olaf Haraldsson Geirstadalf (died in 934), reputed son of King Harald Fairhair of Norway
 Olaf II of Norway (995–1030), King of Norway from 1015 to 1028
 Olaf III of Norway (c. 1050 – 1093), King of Norway from 1067 to 1093